Cumberland Gap Historic District may refer to:
Cumberland Gap Historic District, listed on the NRHP in Claiborne County, Tennessee
The Cumberland Gap, also designated as the Cumberland Gap Historic District